Calochilus pulchellus, commonly known as the pretty beard orchid, is a species of orchid endemic to the south coast of New South Wales. It has a single dark green leaf with a dark red base and up to five pale green to greenish yellow flowers with red striations and a labellum with a coppery red "beard". Fewer than thirty plants growing in three sites are known.

Description
The leaf is fully developed at flowering time. Individual flowers last for between two and four days. The lateral sepals are a similar length but narrower and spread apart from each other. The column has two blackish "eyes" without a ridge between them. Flowering occurs from October to November but each flower only last between two and four days.

Taxonomy and naming
Calochilus pulchellus was first formally described in 2006 by David Jones from a specimen collected in the Morton National Park and the description was published in Australian Orchid Research. The specific epithet (pulchellus) is the diminutive form of the Latin word pulcher meaning "pretty", hence "pretty little", referring to the flowers of this species.

Distribution and habitat
The pretty beard orchid grows in low heath. It is only known from three sites in the Shoalhaven district.

Conservation
This orchid is listed as "endangered" under the New South Wales Biodiversity Conservation Act 2016. The main threat to the species is its small population size.

References

pulchellus
Flora of New South Wales
Endemic orchids of Australia
Plants described in 2006